Natasha Liana Hudson (born 9 September 1982) is a Malaysian actress.

Career
She is an actress that has been seen on numerous television commercials, films and TV series in Malaysia and Indonesia. She also published two books in 2007, one an English poetry book titled My heart, My soul, My passion and a children's story book titled Puisi Indah Si Pari Pari.

In 2007 she was given an award for Most Promising Actress at the Malaysian film festival for her role as Nasrin from her film Chermin.

She has a sister, Tania Nadira Hudson, who is also an actress and model.

She is of Australian-Malay descent. She is a Muslim.

Filmography

Film

Television
 Antara Keju dan Belacan (2011)
 Bait Cinta (2011)
 Deru Ombak (2011)
 Andai Ku Tahu (2012)
 Cinta Luar Biasa (2012)
 Tudung (2012)
 Pulau (2012)
 Bisik Syaitan Berbisik (2021)

Theatre
 Ibu zain (musical)
 Gamat (musical)

Awards and nominations

References

External links
 

Living people
21st-century Malaysian actresses
1982 births
Malaysian film actresses
Malaysian stage actresses
Malaysian television actresses
Malaysian people of Australian descent
Malaysian people of Malay descent
Malaysian Muslims